Marijan Bakula (born 17 April 1966 in Žepče, SFR Yugoslavia) is a Bosnian-Herzegovinian retired football player.

Club career
On the club level, he played for several Croatian, Bosnian and Slovenian clubs.

See also
List of NK Maribor players

External links
PrvaLiga profile 

1966 births
Living people
People from Žepče
Croats of Bosnia and Herzegovina
Association football midfielders
Yugoslav footballers
Bosnia and Herzegovina footballers
NK Čelik Zenica players
NK Maribor players
NK Mura players
NK Zadar players
HNK Šibenik players
NK Kamen Ingrad players
NK Železničar Maribor players
Yugoslav Second League players
Slovenian PrvaLiga players
Croatian Football League players
Bosnia and Herzegovina expatriate footballers
Expatriate footballers in Slovenia
Bosnia and Herzegovina expatriate sportspeople in Slovenia
Expatriate footballers in Croatia
Bosnia and Herzegovina expatriate sportspeople in Croatia